Harakmbut or Harakmbet (stress on the second syllable) is the native language of the Harakmbut people of Peru. It is spoken along the Madre de Dios and Colorado Rivers, in the pre-contact country of the people. There are two dialects that remain vital: Amarakaeri (Arakmbut) and Watipaeri (Huachipaeri), which are reported to be mutually intelligible. The relationship between speakers of the two dialects is hostile.

As of 2012, Amarakaeri is still being learned by children in some communities. There 5% literacy compared to 75% literacy in the second language Spanish. They live in the communities of Puerto Luz, Shintuya, San José Del Karene, Barranco Chico, Boca Inambari, Boca Ishiriwe, Puerto Azul, Masenawa and Kotsimba. The name Amarakaeri, from wa-mba-arak-a-eri "murderers", is considered derogatory; the endonym Arakmbut is preferred.

Speakers of Watipaeri (wa-tipa-eri) are mostly concentrated in the indigenous communities of Queros and Santa Rosa de Huacaria, in the Peruvian rainforest. Their members have been experiencing cultural loss, including the complexities of their language, particularly because of the generational gap between the elders and the youth.

Varieties
Besides Amarakaeri, with an ethnic population in 2007 of 1043, and Watipaeri, with an ethnic population of 392, attested dialects are:
Arasaeri: 317 in Arazaeri (arãsã-eri, people of the Marcatapa River)
Pukirieri: 168 (pukiri-eri, people of the Pukiri River)
Sapiteri and Kisambaeri (47 in Barranco Chico)
Toyoeri: extinct (toyo(dn)-eri, people downriver)

There are at most only a handful of fluent speakers remaining for any of these dialects.

The position of Toyoeri is disputed. Some researchers have divided the dialects into two main groups, with Watipaeri and Toyoeri phonetically and lexically somewhat different from Amarakaeri/Arakmbut, Arasaeri and Sapiteri. Data from Aza (1936) and Peck (1958), however, suggest that Arakmbut is different from the other four, which are similar to each other.

Classification
Harakmbut has been accepted as a language isolate since the 1960s. Adelaar (2000, 2007) presents mainly lexical evidence that it is related to the Katukinan family of Brazil; influence from Tupian languages also suggest an origin in Brazil. Campbell (2012) accepted the evidence as "reasonably persuasive".
Jolkesky (2011) concurs, and adds Arawan to the family.
Glottolog notes "promising lexical links with Katukina [...] with a fair amount of near-identical forms, but the systems of pronouns, numerals or bound morphology show no cognation.Language contact
Jolkesky (2016) notes that there are lexical similarities with the Pano, Puinave-Nadahup, Tupian, and Arawakan language families due to contact.

Similarities with Tupian may be indicative of an earlier origin downstream in the Madeira River interaction sphere.

 Phonology 
The following inventory is that of Amarakaeri, the most vital dialect. Other dialects appear to only differ in the presence of /h/ or the lack of /w/.

Amarakaeri has ten vowels:

When adjacent to /a/, /e/ tends to rise to /i/ or /j/.

Consonants are as follows:

They vary between dialects, but also between speakers and even with the same speaker in Arakmbut. They may be epenthetic consonants used to demarcate syllables that do not have an onset or coda consonant.

/t k n s/ occur in syllable codas, and /ŋ/ only in syllable codas.

Stops tend toward  in intervocalic position. (In Toyoeri and Sapiteri, this has only been reported for /k/.) (In Toyoeri and Sapiteri, this has only been reported for /t/.)

The nasal consonants have different realizations, depending on whether adjacent vowels are oral or nasal, with /m/ and /n/ affected before an oral vowel, and /n/ and /ŋ/ affected after one:
{| class="wikitable" style="text-align:center"
|+Nasal allophones
|-
! !! V_ !! Ṽ_ !! _V !! _Ṽ
|-
!m
|m||m||mb||m
|-
!n
|dn||n||nd||n
|-
!ŋ
|ɡŋ||ŋ||colspan=2| —
|}
This allophonic variation is reflected in the community orthography, and the same pattern has been reported for Watipaeri, Arasaeri, Toyoeri and Sapiteri.

The nature of Harakmbut nasality has yet to be fully elucidated, and in Amarakaeri at least there is some free variation of allophones. Nonetheless, there is a phonemic distinction of vowel nasalization after nasal consonants, as in the proper name .

Stress is on the penultimate syllable, not counting inflectional suffixes, which do not change stress placement in a word.

Vocabulary
Loukotka (1968) lists the following basic vocabulary items for Toyeri.

{| class="wikitable sortable"
! gloss !! Toyeri
|-
| one || unchinda
|-
| two || botta
|-
| three || baʔpa
|-
| tooth || ua-ít
|-
| tongue || ua-no
|-
| hand || ua-mba
|-
| woman || uaxet
|-
| water || meei
|-
| fire || táʔak
|-
| moon || pöxen
|-
| maize || sinke
|-
| jaguar || apane
|-
| house || xahak
|}

See also
Macro-Otomakoan languages
Amarakaeri Communal Reserve

Bibliography
Aza Martínez, J. P. (1936). Vocabulario español-arasairi. Lima: San Martín y Cía. BACELAR, L. N. (1992). Fonologia preliminar da língua Kanoê. Brasilia: UnB.
Peck, Ch. (2008 [1979]). Toyeri y Sapiteri: un informe preliminar de la fonología y el vocabulario. (Datos Etno-Lingüísticos, 67). Lima: Ministerio de Educación and Summer Institute of Linguistics.
Tripp, R. (1995). Diccionario Amarakaeri-Castellano. (Serie Lingüística Peruana, 34). Yarinacocha: Ministerio de Educación / Summer Institute of Linguistics.

References

Sources

Alain Fabre, 2005, Diccionario etnolingüístico y guía bibliográfica de los pueblos indígenas sudamericanos'',Harakmbet – Lengua aislada (language isolate) 

 
Language families
Indigenous languages of the Andes
Languages of Peru